The six-factor formula is used in nuclear engineering to determine the multiplication of a nuclear chain reaction in a non-infinite medium.

The symbols are defined as:
 is the number density of atoms of a specific nuclide.
 is the resonance integral for absorption of a specific nuclide.
.
 is the average lethargy gain per scattering event.
Lethargy is defined as decrease in neutron energy.
 (fast utilization) is the probability that a fast neutron is absorbed in fuel.
 is the probability that a fast neutron absorption in fuel causes fission.
 is the probability that a thermal neutron absorption in fuel causes fission.
 is the geometric buckling.
 is the diffusion length of thermal neutrons.
.
 is the age to thermal.
.
 is the evaluation of  where  is the energy of the neutron at birth.

Multiplication
The multiplication factor, is defined as (see nuclear chain reaction): 

 If  is greater than 1, the chain reaction is supercritical, and the neutron population will grow exponentially. 
 If  is less than 1, the chain reaction is subcritical, and the neutron population will exponentially decay. 
 If , the chain reaction is critical and the neutron population will remain constant.

See also
 Critical mass
 Nuclear chain reaction
 Nuclear reactor
 Four factor formula

References

Nuclear technology
Radioactivity